Savinac is a village in the municipality of Bojnik, Serbia. According to the 2002 census, the village has a population of 41 people.

References

Populated places in Jablanica District
Bojnik